Herman Louis Franks (January 4, 1914 – March 30, 2009) was a catcher, coach, manager, general manager and scout in Major League Baseball. He was born in Price, Utah, to Italian-American immigrant parents and attended the University of Utah.

Playing career
He broke into professional baseball with the Hollywood Stars of the Pacific Coast League in 1932, but he was soon acquired by the St. Louis Cardinals and joined their vast farm system.

He made the Cardinals for just 17 games and 17 at-bats in 1939, before being drafted by the Brooklyn Dodgers, where he served as a second-string catcher in 1940–41 and began his long association with Leo Durocher, then Brooklyn's manager. As a Dodger, Franks caught Tex Carleton's no-hitter on April 30, 1940.

Franks missed  seasons during World War II, when he served in the United States Navy in the Pacific Theater of Operations and attained the rank of lieutenant (junior grade).  He resumed his playing career in 1946 with the Triple-A Montreal Royals, then became the playing manager of the Dodgers' St. Paul Saints affiliate in the Triple-A American Association in 1947. In August of that season, however, he resigned his post to return to the Major Leagues as a backup catcher with the Philadelphia Athletics, where he appeared in 48 games in 1947–48 and batted .221.

Coaching career
In 1949, Franks received his first coaching assignment, as an aide to Durocher with the New York Giants, and was activated for one final MLB game on August 28, 1949—going 2-for-3 against the Cincinnati Reds in a 4–2 New York triumph.

As a coach with the Giants from 1949 to 1955, he was a member of two National League championship clubs and was the third-base coach of the World Series (1954) title team. However, he performed multiple tasks for Durocher during those seven seasons. According to author Joshua Prager in his 2006 book The Echoing Green, Franks played a critical role in the Giants' Bobby Thomson's famous pennant-winning home run in the 1951 NL tiebreaker playoffs—Baseball's Shot Heard Round The World. According to Prager, Franks was stationed in the Giants' center-field clubhouse at the Polo Grounds, their home field, stealing the opposing catcher's signs through a telescope and relaying them through second-string catcher Sal Yvars (positioned in the bullpen) to the Giants' coaches and hitters. When asked where he was when Thomson hit his home run, Franks said, in 1996, that he was "doing something for Durocher" at the time.

Whatever his role may have been on that day, Franks was known as a devotee of Durocher-style, win-at-any-cost baseball, including intimidation through flying spikes and brushback pitching. Dodger outfielder Carl Furillo told author Roger Kahn that Franks was known to poke his head into the Brooklyn clubhouse before games, to taunt Furillo that Giant pitchers were planning to throw at his head in the upcoming contest. Furillo, whose hatred for Durocher was so intense that he would engage Durocher in a fistfight in a Giant dugout filled with enemy players, said of the Giants, in Peter Golenbock's book Bums: An Oral History of the Brooklyn Dodgers, "They were dirty ballplayers ... They all wanted to be like Durocher, to copy Durocher. That Herman Franks, he was another one."

Managing career

Durocher quit the Giants after the  season, and the team relocated to San Francisco after . From 1956 to 1964, Franks was briefly a Giants' scout, then the general manager of the PCL Salt Lake City Bees. He also spent two additional one-year terms (in 1958 and 1964) as a San Francisco Giants coach before succeeding Alvin Dark as the club's manager a half‐hour after the conclusion of the 1964 season on October 4.

Even though the team featured future Hall of Famers Willie Mays, Orlando Cepeda, Willie McCovey, Juan Marichal and Gaylord Perry, Franks's four seasons (1965–68) managing the Giants each produced frustrating second-place finishes in the National League. After he stepped down as skipper following the conclusion of the 1968 season, he was quoted as saying, "Is finishing second so evil?" He was replaced by Clyde King.

A highly successful businessman off the field, Franks spent the next eight years out of the Major League spotlight, apart from a partial season (August and September 1970) as a pitching coach under Durocher with the Chicago Cubs. Franks returned to the major leagues as newly appointed Cubs general manager Bob Kennedy's first and only choice to replace Jim Marshall as manager on November 24, 1976. In 1977, he led the Cubs back to the .500 level, but the team lost ground in 1978 and was just one game above the break-even mark in September 1979 when Franks resigned (issuing a number of complaints about certain players). He succeeded Kennedy as the Cubs' interim general manager on May 22, 1981. However, most of his tenure was taken up by the 1981 players' strike. He was replaced by Dallas Green just under five months later on October 15 as part of the franchise ownership transition from William Wrigley III to Tribune Company.

Although Franks compiled a poor record as a player (a batting average of .199 with three home runs and 43 RBI in 188 games over parts of six seasons), he notched a winning record as a manager: 605–521, .537.

References

External links
 Baseball-Reference.com – career managing record and playing statistics
 McGrath, Dan. "Former Chicago Cubs manager Herman Franks dies at 95," Chicago Tribune, Wednesday, April 1, 2009.

 Drew, Jay. "SLC baseball legend Herman Franks dies at 95," The Salt Lake Tribune, Wednesday, April 1, 2009.
 Herman Louis Franks Sr. – The Salt Lake Tribune Obituary Notices.

Bibliography
 Baseball-library.com
 Official Baseball Register (1968 edition). St. Louis: The Sporting News.
 Golenbock, Peter. Bums: An Oral History of the Brooklyn Dodgers. New York: G. P. Putnam's Sons, 1984.

1914 births
2009 deaths
American people of Italian descent
Baseball coaches from Utah
Baseball players from Salt Lake City
Brooklyn Dodgers players
Caribbean Series managers
Chicago Cubs coaches
Chicago Cubs executives
Chicago Cubs managers
Columbus Red Birds players
Hollywood Stars players
Houston Buffaloes players
Jacksonville Jax players
Major League Baseball catchers
Major League Baseball executives
Major League Baseball general managers
Major League Baseball pitching coaches
Major League Baseball third base coaches
Minor league baseball executives
Montreal Royals players
New York Giants (NL) coaches
New York Giants (NL) players
New York Giants (NL) scouts
Omaha Packers players
People from Price, Utah
Philadelphia Athletics players
Sacramento Solons players
St. Louis Cardinals players
St. Paul Saints (AA) managers
St. Paul Saints (AA) players
San Francisco Giants coaches
San Francisco Giants managers
San Francisco Giants scouts
Sportspeople from Salt Lake City
United States Navy personnel of World War II